Ružica Džankić (born 7 July 1994 in Zagreb, Croatia) is a Croatian female basketball player.

External links
Profile at eurobasket.com

1994 births
Living people
Croatian Women's Basketball League players
Croatian women's basketball players
Small forwards
Basketball players from Zagreb